Dustin is a surname and mainly masculine given name.

Etymology 
Dustin originates from an English surname, which is derived from the Norman personal name Tustin, variant form of Turstin, Torstein, which is in turn derived from the Old Norse Þorsteinn (Torsten). This Old Norse name is composed of elements meaning Þor (the god Thor) and steinn "stone".

Given name 

Dustin Ackley (born 1988), American former baseball player
Dustin Antolin (born 1989), American baseball pitcher
Dustin Bomheuer (born 1991), German football player
Dustin Boyd (born 1986), Canadian ice hockey player
Dustin Brown (born 1984), American ice hockey player
Dustin Brown (born 1984), Jamaican-German tennis player
Dustin Breeding (born 1987), member of R&B group Audio
Dustin Byfuglien (born 1985), American ice hockey player in the NHL
Dustin Cherniawski (born 1981), Canadian football player
Dustin Colquitt (born 1982), American football player
Dustin Crum (born 1999), American football player
Dustin Demri-Burns (born 1978), English actor, comedian and writer
Dustin Diamond (1977–2021), American actor
Dustin Fletcher (born 1975), Australian rules footballer
Dustin Gee (1942–1986), British comedian
Dustin Hermanson (born 1972), American baseball player
Dustin Hersee (born 1975), Canadian backstroke swimmer
Dustin Higgs (1972–2021), American convicted murderer
Dustin Hoffman (born 1937), American actor
Dustin Honken (1968–2020), American convicted murderer
Dustin Johnson (born 1984), American professional golfer
Dustin Kensrue (born 1980), American musician
Dustin Lyman (born 1976), American football player
Dustin Lynch (born 1985), American country singer and songwriter
Dustin Martin (born 1991), Australian rules footballer
Dustin Milligan (born 1985), Canadian film and television actor
Dustin Moskovitz (born 1984), co-founder of Facebook
Dustin Nguyen (born 1962), Vietnamese-American actor, director, writer, martial artist
Dustin Poirier (born 1989), American mixed martial artist
Dustin Nippert (born 1981), American baseball player
Dustin Pedroia (born 1983), American baseball player
Dustin Rhodes, (born 1969; real name Dustin Runnels), American professional wrestler
Dustin Vaughan (born 1991), American football player
Dustin Garrett-Nicholas Fedoruk (born 1993), American Navy Veteran, 
Dustin Woodard (born 1998), American football player
Dustin Langrehr (born 1992), American entrepreneur

Surname 
Frederic H. Dustin (1930-2018), American philanthropist
Hannah Duston, née Dustin, American historical figure

Fictional characters 
Dustin Henderson, a character in the Netflix series Stranger Things
Dustin Brooks, a character in the television series Zoey 101
Dustin the Big Hopper from Starlight Express
Dustin the Turkey, an Irish television puppet
Dustin Brooks (Power Rangers Ninja Storm), the yellow Wind Ranger portrayed by Glen McMillan

See also 
Dustin-Leigh Konzelman, reality-television participant or contestant and beauty queen pageant
Dustin (disambiguation)
Torsten

References 

English given names
English unisex given names
English masculine given names
Unisex given names 
Masculine given names
Surnames from given names